Eucalyptus oldfieldii, commonly known as Oldfield's mallee, is a species of mallee or tree that is endemic to Western Australia. It has a sprawling or spreading habit, mostly smooth greyish or brownish bark, lance-shaped adult leaves, flower buds in groups of three, white flowers and conical, cup-shaped or hemispherical fruit.

Description
It has smooth, mottled greyish or brownish bark, often with ribbons of imperfectly shed bark near the base. Flowering occurs between May and October and the flowers are white or creamy white.

Taxonomy and naming
Eucalyptus oldfieldii was first formally described by the botanist Ferdinand von Mueller in 1860 in Fragmenta Phytographiae Australiae. The name of the species honours Augustus Frederick Oldfield who collected the type specimen near the Murchison River.

Distribution and habitat
Oldfield's mallee is found on sand plains and ridges and on rocky slopes and is widespread north and north-east of Perth to near Shark Bay and Warburton, where it grows in rocky loamy soils over ironstone.

Conservation status
This eucalypt is classified as "not threatened" by the Western Australian Government Department of Parks and Wildlife.

See also
List of Eucalyptus species

References

Eucalypts of Western Australia
Trees of Australia
oldfieldii
Myrtales of Australia
Mallees (habit)
Plants described in 1860
Taxa named by Ferdinand von Mueller